"A Well Respected Man" is a song by the British band the Kinks, written by the group's lead singer and rhythm guitarist Ray Davies, and originally released in the United Kingdom on the EP Kwyet Kinks in September 1965. The song was released on the album Kinkdom in the United States. It was also released as a single in the US and Continental Europe.

"A Well Respected Man" remains one of the band's most popular and best known songs. It is one of four Kinks songs included on The Rock and Roll Hall of Fame's list of the 500 Songs That Shaped Rock and Roll along with "You Really Got Me," "Waterloo Sunset," and "Lola".

Background
Davies composed the song based on a negative experience with upper class guests at a luxury resort where he was staying in 1965. He crafted the song to mock what he perceived as their condescension and self-satisfaction.

Pye refused to release "A Well Respected Man" as a single in the UK because the record company wanted a song more similar to the band's raunchier previous hits. It was released as a single in the United States during October of that same year and reached No. 13. Following the success of "Dedicated Follower of Fashion", "A Well Respected Man" was also released as a single in mainland Europe in March 1966 (although pressed in the UK, it was an export-only issue).

The song also includes the word "fag", interpreted by Americans as a reference to homosexuality. However, Davies later said that this was not intended:

Cash Box described it as a "very catchy folkish number with a message lyric."

Music and lyrics
Musically, it marked the beginning of an expansion in the Kinks' inspirations, drawing much from British Music Hall traditions (a style which was to feature prominently on later 1960s songs such as "Dedicated Follower of Fashion" and "Mister Pleasant"). Lyrically, the song is notable as being the first of Ray Davies' compositions to overtly address the theme of British class consciousness. Indeed, the song offers a satirical commentary on the entrenched mores and conventions of the English upper and middle classes, while hinting at the frustration and casual hypocrisy that underlie this fastidiously maintained veneer of "respectability".

In popular culture
 Petula Clark recorded a French version, "Un Jeune Homme Bien", which was released on the French EP Il Faut Revenir in 1965 and in 1966 on the album Petula Clark (Petula 66 in Canada).  This version was also recorded in 1966 by Canadian singer Renée Martel.
 The song was featured in the 2007 film Juno and in the 2010 film Love & Other Drugs featuring Anne Hathaway.  
 The song can be heard during the end credits of the 2004 film The Life and Death of Peter Sellers, in the Criminal Minds episode, "Normal", in the Supernatural episode, "It's A Terrible Life" and in the Homicide: Life on the Street episode, "Colors".
The song is used as the theme tune to the Sky Atlantic sitcom Mr. Sloane and is featured prominently throughout the series.
The song is used in the pilot of Mr. Mercedes as a background song to the main protagonist, Brendan Gleeson awakening and getting dressed.

Personnel 
According to band researcher Doug Hinman:

Ray Davieslead vocals, acoustic guitar
Dave Daviesbacking vocal, electric guitar
Pete Quaifebass
Mick Avorydrums

Charts

References

Sources 

 
 

1965 singles
The Kinks songs
Song recordings produced by Shel Talmy
Songs written by Ray Davies
Pye Records singles
Reprise Records singles
Satirical songs
1965 songs
Number-one singles in Sweden